Joseph H. Ratica (August 4, 1914 – 1942) was an American football center and linebacker for the Brooklyn Dodgers of the National Football League during their 1939 season. He was born in Pennsylvania, and attended St. Vincent College. On October 22, 1939, he played in the first NFL game to be broadcast live on television, against the Philadelphia Eagles.

References

1914 births
1942 deaths
American football centers
American football linebackers
Brooklyn Dodgers (NFL) players
Players of American football from Pennsylvania
Wilmington Clippers players